Laura Fünfstück (born 21 December 1994) is a German professional golfer who plays on the Ladies European Tour.

Amateur career
Fünfstück started playing golf at the age of three when her parents bought her first set of plastic clubs. She won the 2013 French International Lady Juniors Amateur Championship (Internationaux de France – Trophee Esmond) and finished her amateur career with a win at the German National Amateur in 2017. Fünfstück was part of the German National Team, representing her country four times in the European Ladies' Team Championship and the 2014 Espirito Santo Trophy, the World Team Championship. She represented Europe at the Patsy Hankins Trophy in 2016. 

Before turning pro in January 2018, Fünfstück played college golf and studied finance at the College of Charleston from 2013 to 2017. Three out of her four years, she was named Player of the Year in the Colonial Athletic Association conference, finishing top-25 in the 2017 NCAA Championship. She was the first College of Charleston female golfer to advance to Nationals and with five wins holds the school record for most college tournament wins. Fünfstück won the Kiawah Island Classic, the largest collegiate tournament in the country with a field of 232 players.

Professional career
In 2018, her rookie year as a professional, she won the South African Women's Masters. She joined the Ladies European Tour, where she made five starts and recorded a best finish of T8 in the Lalla Meryem Cup. In 2019, she played in 19 tournaments, posted six top-10 finishes, and ended the season in ninth place on the Order of Merit.

In 2020, Fünfstück ended the season in tenth place on the Race to Costa del Sol. She narrowly missed out on the playoff by a stroke at the Omega Dubai Moonlight Classic, ending T3 behind Minjee Lee and Celine Boutier. In 2021, she played in 10 LET events where her best finish of T7 at the Big Green Egg Open in the Netherlands. Hit with back pain, she took a one-year hiatus from tour in mid-2021 to focus on getting back to full health.

Amateur wins
2013 French International Lady Juniors Amateur Championship (Internationaux de France – Trophee Esmond)
2016 CSU Fall Invitational
2017 German National Amateur, Kiawah Island Intercollegiate
Source:

Professional wins (2)

Ladies Sunshine Tour
2018 South African Women's Masters

ALPG Tour
2020 Windaroo Lakes ALPG Pro-Am

Team appearances
Amateur
European Ladies' Team Championship (representing Germany): 2013, 2014, 2015, 2016, 2017
Espirito Santo Trophy (representing Germany): 2014
Patsy Hankins Trophy (representing Europe): 2016

Source:

References

External links

German female golfers
Ladies European Tour golfers
Sportspeople from Darmstadt (region)
People from Offenbach (district)
1994 births
Living people
21st-century German women